Michael Joseph Ryan may refer to:

 Mike Ryan (footballer, born 1930) (1930–2006), English footballer
 Michael J. Ryan (doctor) (born 1965), Irish trauma surgeon and epidemiologist
 Michael J. Ryan (biologist), American biologist